Lathyrus japonicus, the sea pea, beach pea, circumpolar pea or sea vetchling, is a species of flowering plant in the legume family Fabaceae, native to temperate coastal areas of the Northern Hemisphere and Argentina.

The flowers are broad, with a dark purple standard petal and paler purple wing and keel petals; they are produced in racemes of up to twelve flowers.

Description
Lathyrus japonicus is a perennial plant. The leaves are alternate, greyish green and somewhat succulent, almost stalkless with large, wide stipules. The leaf blades are pinnate with three to five pairs of narrow lanceolate leaflets with blunt tips, entire margins and a terminal tendril. These have five sepals and five petals and are irregular with a standard, two wings and a fused keel. There are ten stamens and a single carpel. This plant flowers in mid-to-late summer (July and August in the Northern Hemisphere, January and February in the Southern Hemisphere).

Distribution and habitat
Lathyrus japonicus is native to temperate parts of Europe, Asia, North and South America. Its typical habitat is sandy or stony seashores and other coastal locations. The unusually extensive native range is explained by the ability of the seeds to remain viable while floating in sea water for up to five years, enabling the seeds to drift nearly worldwide. Germination occurs when the hard outer seed coat is abraded by waves on sand and gravel.

The pods can be eaten but like many members of the genus Lathyrus they contain β-oxalyl-L-α,β-diaminopropionic acid, which can cause paralysis called lathyrism. The leaves of the plant are used in Chinese traditional medicine.

References

japonicus
Edible legumes
Flora of Asia
Flora of Europe
Flora of North America
Flora of South America
Flora of California
Flora of Canada
Flora of Greenland
Flora without expected TNC conservation status